My Father's Eyes may refer to:

"My Father's Eyes" (song), a 1998 song by Eric Clapton
"My Father's Eyes", a 1999 song by Phil Driscoll
My Father's Eyes (album), a 1979 album by Amy Grant containing the song of the same title written by Gary Chapman